The Historical Museum (German: Historisches Museum) in Frankfurt am Main, Germany, was founded in 1878, and includes cultural and historical objects relating to the history of Frankfurt and Germany. It moved into the Saalhof in 1955, and a new extension was opened in 1972.

The 1970s extension is currently being replaced by a modern new exhibition building and a small administration building which are expected to be completed by 2015.

Collection
The museum's collection is displayed in several permanent chronological exhibitions: Mediaeval Frankfurt, the Late Middle Ages, the sixteenth to eighteenth centuries, the nineteenth-century city, and its history as a metropolis from 1866 to 2001. Special exhibitions are also on display.

Artworks

Museumsufer 
Historical Museum is part of the Museumsufer.

See also 
 Museumsufer
 List of museums in Germany

References

External links 

 

Museums in Frankfurt
Museums established in 1878
City museums in Germany
Frankfurt-Altstadt
1878 establishments in Germany